The 14.5×114mm (.57 calibre) is a heavy machine gun and anti-materiel rifle cartridge used by the Soviet Union, the former Warsaw Pact, modern Russia, and other countries.

It was originally developed for the PTRS and PTRD anti-tank rifles, and was later used as the basis for the KPV heavy machine gun that formed the basis of the ZPU series anti-aircraft guns that is also the main armament of the BTR series of armoured personnel carriers from the BTR-60 to the BTR-80 and for heavy anti-materiel sniper rifles.

Cartridge dimensions
The 14.5×114mm has 42.53 ml (655 grains H2O) cartridge case capacity. The exterior shape of the case was designed to promote reliable case feeding and extraction in bolt-action rifles and machine guns alike, under extreme conditions.

14.5×114mm maximum cartridge dimensions. All dimensions in millimetres (mm).

Americans define the shoulder angle at alpha/2 = 22.5 degrees. The common rifling twist rate for this cartridge is 455 mm (1 in 17.91 in), 8 grooves, ⌀ lands = 14.50 mm, ⌀ grooves = 14.95 mm.

According to the official guidelines the 14.5×114 case can handle up to 360 MPa (52,213 psi) piezo pressure. In C.I.P. regulated countries every rifle cartridge combo has to be proofed at 125% of this maximum C.I.P. pressure to be certified for sale to consumers.

Ammunition types

 BS: Armour-piercing incendiary original anti-tank round. The projectile weighs 64.4 grams and is 51 millimetres long with a 38.7 gram core of tungsten carbide with 1.8 grams of incendiary material in the tip. The overall round weighs approximately 200 grams and is 155 millimetres long. The projectile has a muzzle velocity of approximately 1,006 metres per second and can penetrate 30–32 millimetres of RHA steel at an incidence of 0 degrees at a range of 500 metres, or 40 millimetres at a range of 100 metres.
 B-32: Armour-piercing incendiary full metal jacket round with a hardened steel core. Projectile weight is 64 g and muzzle velocity is 1,006 m/s. Armour penetration at 500 m is 32 mm of RHA at 90 degrees.
 BZT: Armour-piercing incendiary tracer full metal jacket round with a steel core. Projectile weight is 59.56 g and muzzle velocity is 1,006 m/s. Tracer burns to at least 2,000 m.
 MDZ: High-explosive incendiary bullet of instant action. Projectile weight is 59.68 g.
 ZP: Incendiary tracer round

Cartridges use lacquered steel cases and percussion primers. Some countries also use brass cartridge cases. The propellant consists of 28.8 g smokeless powder with seven tubes, designated as "5/7NA powder". Two different versions of bullet series are known, the earlier has a conventional bullet jacket with a boat-tail. These have a long engraving portion that causes considerable barrel wear. The newer bullet types have a smaller engraving portion with a rounder boat-tail and were used from about 1957 on.

The cartridge has been manufactured in Bulgaria, China, Egypt, Hungary, Iraq, North Korea, Poland, Romania, Russia, and the former Czechoslovakia. There are new Chinese armour-piercing types:

 DGJ02: APIDS-T cartridges use 45 g tungsten penetrators, wrapped in discarding sabots (similar to the US military SLAP cartridges) with dual colour tracers to aid ranging.  The sabot splits and leaves the penetrator between 150 and 200 m from the muzzle. It has a muzzle velocity of 1,250 m/s and is quoted as being able to penetrate 20 mm of armour plate set at an angle of 60° at 1,000 m.
 DGE02: APHEI cartridges weigh between 175 and 188 g. At 1,000 m it is quoted as having a 90 percent chance of being able to penetrate 15 mm of armour plate set at 30°. At 300 m after penetrating a 2 mm soft steel plate (representing an aircraft skin) it can further penetrate a 1.2 mm-thick steel plate producing 20 fragments. Upon explosion between 75 and 95 incendiary pieces are formed which have an 80% chance of igniting aviation fuel.

Chambered weapons
Anti-materiel rifles
 Anzio rifle
 Denel NTW-20
 Gepard M-3
 Istiglal IST-14.5
 Mambi-1 AMR
 PDSHP
 PTRS-41 (anti-tank rifle)
 PTRD-41 (anti-tank rifle)
 Shaher
 Snipex T-Rex
 Snipex Alligator
 Truvelo 14.5×114mm
 Vidhwansak
 Şer rifle ( self made anti-material-rifle )

Machine guns
 Slostin machine gun (heavy variant)
 KPV heavy machine gun
 Chinese Type 56 (KPV) and Type 58 (KPVT) heavy machine guns
 Type 02/QJG-02 heavy machine gun

Other
 ZPU anti-aircraft guns
 2Kh35 inserted unified self-loading gun

See also
 12.7×108mm
 .50 BMG
 20 mm caliber
 23 mm caliber
 25 mm caliber
 30 mm caliber

References

Further reading

External links

 14,5x114 large-caliber cartridges

 
Military cartridges
Pistol and rifle cartridges
Weapons and ammunition introduced in 1941
Anti-materiel cartridges